Margaret More or Moore may refer to:

Margaret Roper (1505–1544), née More, English writer and translator, daughter of Sir Thomas More
Margaret Clement (1508–1570), née Giggs, English noblewoman, adopted daughter of Sir Thomas More
Kate Barry (1752–1823), or Margaret Barry, née Moore, American Revolutionary War heroine
Maggie Moore (1851–1926), American-Australian actress 
Margaret Hodges (1911–2005), née Moore, American author
Margaret Moore, Canadian author
Margaret More (composer) (1903–1966), Welsh composer, daughter-in-law of Sir Granville Bantock
Margaret Moore (academic), Canadian political theorist, academic and scholar

See also
Margaret Moore Jeffus, American politician